Mollyrue is a village and townland in County Louth, Ireland. It is located on the N2 road at the junction with the R169, to the north of Collon.

The town is located in the civil parish of Collon.

See also 

 List of towns and villages in Ireland

References 

Towns and villages in County Louth